Kamel Tchalabi (1 April 1947 – 3 May 2021) was an Algerian footballer who played as a right winger.

Life and career
On June 25, 1972, in the Algerian Cup final against Hamra Annaba, Tchalabi was forced to play the military final which he played before the final, and Tchalabi promised to play one half Where did he score a goal, and after seeing that he would play the whole match, Tchalabi decided to complete the match on walk, and after the end of it he went to wear the USM Alger dress, but he was told that he was prohibited from playing the match, which affected himself.

On 3 May 2021, Tchalabi died in Ain Naâdja Hospital at the age of 74.

International
Kamel Tchalabi played only three games with the national team first cap was against Palestine in a friendly match as a starter ended with a win two goals scored by Tchalabi and the last match was in 1972 African Cup of Nations qualification against Morocco it ended in victory with three goals.

Career statistics

Honours
 Algerian Cup runners–up: 1968-69, 1969-70, 1970-71, 1971-72, 1972-73

References

External links
 
 Profile on usm-alger.com site

1947 births
2021 deaths
People from Bologhine
Algerian footballers
Association football forwards
Algeria international footballers
Ligue 1 players
USM Alger players
Footballers from Algiers
21st-century Algerian people